The Hellenic Volleyball Federation (Greek: Ελληνική Ομοσπονδία Πετοσφαίρισης, abbreviated as Ε.Ο.ΠΕ.), is a governing body for volleyball and beach volleyball in Greece. The organization oversees the A1 Ethniki Volleyball league, the Greek Volleyball Cup, the Greek Volleyball League Cup, the Greek Volleyball Super Cup, such as the women's competitions.

Honours

Men's National Team
 Men's European Volleyball Championship
 Third (1): 1987
 Men's European Volleyball League
 Runners-up (1): 2014

See also
Greece men's national volleyball team
A1 Ethniki Volleyball
Greek Volleyball Cup

External links
Official Hellenic Volleyball Federation Site 

Volleyball in Greece
Greece
Volleyball
Sports organizations established in 1970